The Betrayed is a 2008 American thriller film, directed by Amanda Gusack from her own screenplay and starring Melissa George, Oded Fehr and Christian Campbell.

Plot
The story follows a young woman as she's put through a psychological journey under the thumb of a mysterious figure who suspects her husband of stealing millions from a crime syndicate.

Cast
Melissa George ... as Jamie 
Oded Fehr ... as Voice / Alek 
Christian Campbell ... as Kevin 
Alice Krige ... as Falco 
Donald Adams  ... as Shuffle / Rathe 
Scott Heindl ... as Chase 
Kevan Kase  ... as Officer Gene 
Andrew Wheeler ... as Officer Davis 
Blaine Anderson  ... as Officer Wild

References

External links 
 
 
 

2008 films
American thriller films
2008 thriller films
Films produced by Vincent Newman
Films scored by Deborah Lurie
Metro-Goldwyn-Mayer direct-to-video films
2000s English-language films
2000s American films